Eduard Linkers (11 October 1912 – 3 April 2004) was an Austrian actor. He appeared in more than 70 films between 1936 and 1988.

Life
He was born as Eduard Linker to a family of Jewish descent in Czernowitz, Austria-Hungary. He studied acting in Vienna, where he also started his acting career. After Anschluss he escaped to Czechoslovakia. He made his living by teaching English. That's how he met a Czech director František Čáp, who cast him in his movie Men Without Wings (1946). In 1952 he moved to Germany, where he acted in American productions. He spoke Romanian, German, English, Czech, French and Italian.

Selected filmography

 Catherine the Last (1936) - Steinschneider, Braun's secretary
 Peter im Schnee (1937) - Theobald Flambach
 Men Without Wings (1946) - Ullmann
 Nadlidé (1946)
 Uloupená hranice (1947) - Czapan
 Nikdo nic neví (1947) - SS-man Fritz Heinecke
 Krakatit (1948) - Carson
 Getting on in the World (1948) - Banker Antonín Klika
 Zelená knížka (1949) - Salesman Karel Bocan
 Pětistovka (1949)
 Soudný den (1949)
 Křížová trojka (1948) - Dr. Hadrbolec
 Cuba Cabana (1952) - Honneg
 Dutch Girl (1953) - Polizeiwachtmeister
 Das Licht der Liebe (1954) - Gläubiger Walter Zellers
 They Were So Young (1954) - M. Albert
 Jackboot Mutiny (1955) - SS-Mann
 The Double Husband (1955) - Bachwitz
 Mr. Arkadin (1955) - Second Policeman - Munich 
  (1955) - Finanzminister Bollemann
 Kitty and the Great Big World (1956) - Gastjaiswort
 Das Mädchen Marion (1956) - Sawatzki, Pferdehändler
  (1957) - Zahlmeister Kranz
 A Farewell to Arms (1957) - Lieutenant Zimmerman
 Escape from Sahara (1958)
  (1958)
  (1958)
 The Domestic Tyrant (1959) - Prosecutor
 Heiße Ware (1959) - Ludwig Klein
 Labyrinth (1959) - Jacques
 Orientalische Nächte (1960) - Tomaides
 Himmel, Amor und Zwirn (1960)
 I Aim at the Stars (1960) - Minor Role (uncredited)
 The Last Pedestrian (1960) - Herr im Mercedes (uncredited)
 Question 7 (1961) - Otto Zingler - Werkmeister
 The Festival Girls (1961) - Jerome
 A Matter of WHO (1961) - Linkers
 I Must Go to the City (1962) - Bankdirektor Sieper
 Freud: The Secret Passion (1962) - Dr. Torsch (uncredited)
 Als ich noch der Waldbauernbub war... (1963) - Narrator (voice)
 Aus meiner Waldheimat (1963) - Narrator (voice)
 Als ich beim Käthele im Wald war (1963) - Narrator (voice)
 Encounter in Salzburg (1964)
 The Defector (1966) - Fluchthelfer Franz Ritter (uncredited)
 Jack of Diamonds (1967) - Geisling
 Before Winter Comes (1969) - Businessman
 Deep End (1970) - Cinema Owner
 Hurra, ein toller Onkel wird Papa (1970)
 Bloody Friday (1972) - Dr. Gutwein (uncredited)
 The Salzburg Connection (1972) - Tour Guide
 All People Will Be Brothers (1973) - Mann mit Bart
 Steppenwolf (1974) - Mr. Hefte
 The Marquise of O (1976) - Der Arzt
 Derrick (1976-1994) - Kellner / Älteres Ehepaar / Hotelportier / Herr Renz (Last appearance)
  (1977)
 Son of Hitler (1978) - Postmaster
  - Season 1, Episode 2: "Le Tramway Fantôme" (1980) - Mme. Kirsh
 Malevil (1981) - Fabrelatre
 Lovec senzací (1989) - Kishuv otec

References

External links

1912 births
2004 deaths
Austrian male film actors
Austrian male television actors
20th-century Austrian male actors